Narcine brunnea, the brown numbfish or brown electric ray, is a species of numbfish in the family Narcinidae. It is found in Indo-West Pacific countries such as Pakistan off coast, India, Sri Lanka, to the Gulf of Thailand. They mainly live in continental waters, both inshore and offshore.

References

 https://www.itis.gov/servlet/SingleRpt/SingleRpt?search_topic=TSN&search_value=564318

External links
 http://www.marinespecies.org/aphia.php?p=taxdetails&id=275388
 http://www.boldsystems.org/index.php/Taxbrowser_Taxonpage?taxid=64361
 http://shark-references.com/species/view/Narcine-brunnea
 http://thewebsiteofeverything.com/animals/fish/Torpediniformes/Narcinidae/Narcine-brunnea
 https://www.gbif.org/species/2417766

brunnea
Fish described in 1909